Shankar Bapu Apegaonkar, born Shankar Shinde, was an Indian classical musician and an exponent of the Indian percussion instrument by name pakhawaj. Born in 1911 in a Marathi family, he followed the Varkari tradition of music. The Government of India awarded him the fourth highest Indian civilian honour of Padma Shri in 1986. Apegaonkar's son, Udhav Shinde, is also a known percussionist.

See also

 Pakhawaj

References

Recipients of the Padma Shri in arts
Marathi people
Indian male classical musicians
Indian percussionists
1911 births
2002 deaths
20th-century Indian male classical singers